Paolo Portoghesi (born 2 November 1931, Rome) is an Italian architect, theorist, historian and professor of architecture at the University La Sapienza in Rome. He is a former president of the architectural section of the Venice Biennale (1979–92), Editor-in-chief of the journal Controspazio (1969–83), and dean of the Faculty of Architecture at the Politecnico di Milano university (1968–78). 

Portoghesi studied architecture at the Faculty of Architecture at the University of Rome, completing his studies in 1957. He began teaching the history of criticism at the same faculty in 1961. Portoghesi opened an architectural practice with architect-engineer Vittorio Gigliotti (born 1921) in Rome in 1964.

He has specialized in teaching and researching Classical architecture, especially Baroque architecture, and in particular Borromini, but also Michelangelo. His interest in more contemporary architecture coincided largely with that of his colleague in Rome, Bruno Zevi, in championing a more organic form of modernism, evident in, for instance, the work of Victor Horta and Frank Lloyd Wright, and in Italy with neorealism and the Liberty style. This attitude has continued throughout Portoghesi's career, and is clearly visible in his own architecture. It is also evident in his concern for the studies of nature, brought to the fore in his more recent book Nature and Architecture (2000).

Selection of projects and works 

Casa Baldi, Rome (1959)
Casa Andreis Scandriglia (1964)
Casa Bevilacqua (1964)
Theatre of Cagliari (1965)
Casa Papanice Roma (1966)
Church of Sacra Famiglia, Salerno (1969)
The Grand Hotel, Khartoum, Sudan (1972–73)
Royal Court, Amman, Jordan (1973)
Mosque of Rome (1974)
Academy of Fine Arts, L'Aquila (1978–82)
ENEL Condominium, Tarquinia (1981)
Centola Palinuro (Salerno, Italy) Town Plan (Piano Regolatore)(1984)
Tegel residence, IBA Berlin, Germany (1984–88)
Le terme di Montecatini, Pistoia (1987)
The Politeama Theatre, Catanzaro (1988)
The garden and library of Calcata (1990)
The Letto di Ulisse , created by Savio Firmino for the Abitare il Tempo exhibition (1992)
La piazza Leon Battista Alberti, Rimini (1990)
Chapel of Don Giuseppe Rizzo, Alcamo (1995)
Church of Santa Maria della Pace, Terni (1997)
The Rinascimento in Talenti park, Rome (2001)
The Montpellier Gardens (Lattes), France
The Central American Parliament, Esquipulas, Guatemala
The Primavera restaurant, Moscow, Russia
Town Hall square, Pirmasens, Germany.
Headquarters of the Royalties Institute, St. Peter's College, Oxford, UK
Public square, Shanghai, China (2006)
Strasbourg Mosque, 2011
Cimitero Nuovo di Cesena, 2011

Awards 
Honoris Causa in Technical Sciences from the University of Lausanne, Switzerland
Legion d'Honneur, France.

References 

Christian Norberg-Schulz, Alla ricerca dell'architettura perduta, Rome 1982
G.C. Priori, L'architettura ritrovata, Rome 1985
G.C. Priori, Paolo Portoghesi, Bologna 1985
M. Pisani, Dialogo con Paolo Portoghesi, Rome 1989
P. Zermani, Paolo Portoghesi a Palazzo Farnese, Parma 1990
M. Pisani, Paolo Portoghesi, Milan 1992
G.C. Argan et al., Il punto su Paolo Portoghesi, Rome 1993
C. Di Stefano and D. Scatena, Paolo Portoghesi designer, Rome 1998
C. Di Stefano and D. Scatena, Paolo Portoghesi architetto, Rome 1999
Paolo Portoghesi, After modern architecture, New York, Rizoli, 1982
Stanley J. Grenz, A Primer on Postmodernism, Wm. B. Eerdmans Publishing Company, 1996.
Paolo Portoghesi, Nature and Architecture, Skira, Milan, 2000.
Paolo Portoghesi and Fulvio Irace (eds), Emilio Ambasz: A Technological Arcadia, Skira, Milan, 2005.
Benjamin Chavardés, "Paolo Portoghesi et la voie post-moderne : le débat architectural dans l'Italie de la seconde moitié du XXe siècle", Phd, Université de Montpellier III Paul Valéry, 2014.

External links 

 Portoghesi biography

20th-century Italian architects
Italian architecture writers
Italian male non-fiction writers
Italian architectural historians
Postmodern architects
Recipients of the Legion of Honour
Living people
1931 births
Academic staff of the Polytechnic University of Milan
Architects from Rome